Saugus (YTB-780) was a United States Navy . Named for Saugus, Massachusetts, she was the third U.S. Naval vessel to bear the name.

Construction

The contract for Saugus was awarded 31 January 1964. She was laid down on 8 December 1964 at Marinette, Wisconsin, by Marinette Marine and launched 3 August 1965.

Operational history
Saugus was delivered and placed in service at Boston on 10 November 1965. Designated for service overseas, she arrived in Holy Loch, Scotland on 12 March 1966 to provide tug services for SUBRON 14.

Stricken from the Navy Directory on 28 October 1997, Saugus was sold on 17 May 2000 into commercial service.

References

External links

 

Natick-class large harbor tugs
Ships built by Marinette Marine
1965 ships
Saugus, Massachusetts